Sheebah Karungi (born November 11, 1989) is a Ugandan musician, dancer and actress who debuted her acting career in Queen of Katwe as Shakira. After quitting Obsessions, a dance group she joined in 2006, she rose to recognition upon the release of her hit single "Ice Cream". In 2014, she released her debut project Ice Cream, a five-track EP which did well commercially and led her to win back-to-back HiPipo Music Awards Best Female Artist in 2015, 2016, 2017, and 2018. She also won the Artist of the Year award twice, in 2017, 2018, and 2019 at the HiPipo Music Awards.

Life and career
Sheebah Karungi was born and raised by a single mother in Kawempe, a division of Kampala, the capital city of Uganda. After completing her basic education at Kawempe Muslim Primary School, she dropped out of school in senior two when she was a student of Midland High School, Kawempe. At the age of 15, she started dancing for money after she joined a dance group called Stingers before she left the group for Obsessions Music Group in 2006. At Obsessions she developed an interest in music, recording two songs before she left the group for a solo career in music.

In 2010, she released "Kunyenyenza", her first official single, produced by Washington with writing credit from Cindy. She went on to release another song titled "Bulikyekola", featuring vocals from KS Alpha and Prince Fahim and then "Baliwa" featuring Coco Finger. It was until she released "Automatic", a song written by Sizzaman, that her solo career experienced a major turnaround. Upon the success of "Automatic", she teamed up again with Sizzaman to release "Ice Cream" to massive airplay and positive reviews before she went on to release another hit single, "Twesana".

In 2014, she released her first musical project, Ice Cream, a five-track EP which contained hit singles including "Ice Cream" and "Jordan". The EP was well received and helped win her Best Female Artist at the 2014 and 2015 HiPipo Music Awards.

Her second project was titled Nkwatako.

Sheebah held Nkwatako Concert in 2016 and Omwoyo Concert in 2018 at Hotel Africana in Kampala. Both concerts were organized by her management, Team No Sleep. Omwoyo Concert was choreographed by Cathy Patra who has choreographed and appeared in most of her videos. On her second concert, Omwoyo, Sheebah was criticized for her low vocal ability as a live performer.

Sheebah is also a business woman. Under her Sheebah Investments program, she has opened a number of businesses around Kampala including The Red Bar, Red Events (co-owned with dancer Cathy Patra), a hair extension business called Sheebah by Natna and others. Sheebah also owns a large mansion plus a boat.

Sexual Harassment 
Sheebah Karungi shared a video of herself on her social media platforms furiously revealing how a certain man who had armed bodyguards sexually harassed her before a performance. In the video, Sheebah narrates how a man acted inappropriately in front of her team before she stepped on stage during one of her performances.

Singles 
 Farmer (Remix) - With Ykee Benda
 Ice Cream
 Nkwatako
 Tunywe
 Nakyuka
 Kyoyina Omanya
 Sweet Sensation ft. Orezi
 Enyanda
 Ekyaama
 Tevunya ft. Fik Fameica
 Weekend ft Runtown
 Nkwatako
 John Rambo
 Onkutude
 follow me ft Harmonize (musician)
 Jealousy
 Exercise
 Silwana ft Carol nantongo
 Osobola ft Leila Kayondo
 nkulowozaako ft Alvin kizz
 Mummy yo
 mukama yamba
 Leeta ft Ruth Ngendo

Discography

Studio albums
 Ice Cream - EP
Nkwatako (2016)
Karma (2017)
Samali (2021)

Filmography

Awards and nominations

Associated Acts

 Ykee Benda
 Fik Famaica
 Roden Y Kabako
 Chance Nalubega
 Runtown
 Solidstar
 Carol Nantongo
 Meddy
 Alvin Kizz
 The Ben
 John Blaq
 Grenade Official
 Irene Ntale
 Selector Jeff
 Orezi

References

1975 births
Living people
21st-century Ugandan women singers